Luang may refer to:

Luang (title), a Thai noble title
Luang Island, an island in the southwestern part of the Maluku Province, Indonesia
Luang language, a language that is spoken on the islands Luang, Wetang, Moa and Lakor
Luang Prabang, a city and former royal capital located in north central Laos